Road P-24 is a motor road of regional significance in Ukraine. Passes through the territory of Ivano-Frankivsk Oblast, Ternopil Oblast and Khmelnytskyi Oblasts.

Whole length 

Main route 

Route map: :

Notes

References
 
 
 
 
 

Roads in Ivano-Frankivsk Oblast
Roads in Khmelnytskyi Oblast
Roads in Ternopil Oblast